Lambda Cancri (λ Cancri, abbreviated Lambda Cnc, λ Cnc) is a blue-white-hued spectroscopic binary star in the zodiac constellation of Cancer. With a combined apparent visual magnitude of +5.93, it is faintly visible to the naked eye. Based upon parallax measurements obtained during the Gaia mission, it is about 550 light-years distant from the Sun.

The two components are designated Lambda Cancri A (formally named Piautos ) and B.

Nomenclature 

λ Cancri (Latinised to Lambda Cancri) is the binary's Bayer designation. The designations of the two components as Lambda Cancri A and B derive from the convention used by the Washington Multiplicity Catalog (WMC) for multiple star systems, and adopted by the International Astronomical Union (IAU).

The system occurs in the lunar station that was given the name πιαυτος piautos in a Coptic manuscript list of lunar stations, nearly all of which were in "debased" Greek. Walter Crum was of the opinion that Piautos is formed from the Greek word autos "self" and the Coptic determiner pi- "that", which is automatically tacked onto Greek nouns. The combination would (in Greek) mean "the same, the very one". Given that the Greeks are not known to have used lunar stations, the origin of the names is unknown.

In 2016, the IAU organized a Working Group on Star Names (WGSN) to catalog and standardize proper names for stars. The WGSN approved the name Piautos for Lambda Cancri on 1 June 2018 and it is now so included in the List of IAU-approved Star Names. The WGSN had previously stated that where a component letter (from e.g. Washington Double Star Catalog) is not explicitly listed, that the name should be understood to be attributed to the brightest component by visual brightness (Lambda Cancri A in this case).

From this Chinese name, the name Kwan Wei meaning "the bright fire" was given.

Properties 

Its close companion, Lambda Cancri B, has 80% of the mass of the Sun.

References

B-type main-sequence stars
Cancri, Lambda
Cancer (constellation)
Durchmusterung objects
Cancri, 19
070011
040881
3268
Spectroscopic binaries